The Hispano-Suiza H6 is a luxury car that was produced by Hispano-Suiza, mostly in France. Introduced at the 1919 Paris Motor Show, the H6 was produced until 1933. Roughly 2,350 H6, H6B, and H6C cars were produced in total.

Specifications
The H6 engine featured a straight-six engine inspired by designer Marc Birkigt's work on aircraft engines.  It was an all-aluminium engine displacing . Apart from the new overhead camshaft, it was essentially half of Birkigt's aviation V12 design. The seven-bearing crankshaft was milled from a  steel billet to become a sturdy  unit, while the block used screwed-in steel liners, and the water passages were enamelled to prevent corrosion.

One of the most notable features of the H6 was its brakes. They were light-alloy drums on all four wheels with power-assist the first in the industry, driven with a special shaft from the transmission. When the car was decelerating, its own momentum drove the brake servo to provide additional power. This technology was later licensed to other manufacturers, including arch-rival Rolls-Royce.

The 1922 H6B was slightly more powerful. An  engine was used in 1924's H6C.

The H6 series was replaced in 1933 by the J12, which initially used a  V12 pushrod engine.

Special versions
A series of five racing H6Bs with short wheelbases and slightly enlarged engines was built in 1922. These were referred to as "Boulogne", to celebrate the H6's triple victory at the sports car race at Boulogne by pilots Dubonnet, Garnier, and Boyriven in 1923 (Journal des debats, July 27, 1923).

André Dubonnet entered an H6C Boulogne in the 1924 Targa Florio. Dubonnet finished the gruelling event without a body failure, and drove home to Naples afterward. This vehicle is currently housed at the Blackhawk Museum near Danville, California.

A later series of short-wheelbase H6Cs was built, eventually being referred to as "Monzas".

A six-wheeled H6A was ordered by the King of Greece, but after his abdication was purchased by the motion picture director D. W. Griffith. It is now at the Forney Museum in Denver.

Specifications: 1924 H6C Dubonnet Boulogne Targa Florio speedster

Length:  
Width:  
Height
cowl:  
windshield:  
Wheelbase:  
Wheels:   center-locking
Weight:  
Transmission:  three-speed manual
Suspension:
Front:  beam
Rear:  live axle, semi-elliptic leaf spring
Engine:  Hispano-Suiza straight 6
Bore:  
Stroke:  
Displacement:  
Maximum power:   at 3000 rpm (estimated)

Škoda
Some early H6s were built at Hispano-Suiza's industrial complex at La Sagrera, Barcelona, but most H6s were built at Hispano-Suiza's French division in the Parisian suburb of Bois-Colombes. Some 100 H6s were built under license by Škoda in Czechoslovakia from 1926 to 1929.

H6B Dubonnet Xenia 

In 1938, Hispano-Suiza built a one-off H6B for André Dubonnet, in which he installed the engine from the H6C, his own custom suspension system, and custom bodywork by coachbuilder Saoutchik. This H6B served as his own personal car, as well as a showcase of his automotive technologies and aerodynamical innovations. The H6B Dubonnet Xenia is currently owned by Peter W. Mullin and is on display at the Mullin Automotive Museum in Oxnard, California.

In popular culture
In Miss Fisher's Murder Mysteries, Australian detective Phryne Fisher drives a red 1923 Hispano-Suiza H6, which makes frequent appearances in the television series.

In several Agatha Christie novels, main characters drive a Hispano. In The Secret of Chimneys and The Seven Dials Mystery the description fits a Hispano-Suiza Dubonnet from 1924.

A Hispano-Suiza features heavily in the 1924 best-selling novel (later also a play) The Green Hat by Michael Arlen.

References

Citations

Sources

External links
  Hispano-Suiza H6A

H6
Luxury vehicles
Cars introduced in 1919
1920s cars
1930s cars